The following elections occurred in the year 1888.

North America

Canada
 1888 Manitoba general election
 1888 Northwest Territories general election

United States
 1888 New York state election
 1888 South Carolina gubernatorial election
 1888 United States House of Representatives elections
 1888 United States House of Representatives elections in California
 1888 United States House of Representatives elections in South Carolina
 1888 United States presidential election
 1888 United States Senate elections

Europe
 1888 Dutch general election
 1888 Norwegian parliamentary election
 March 1888 Serbian parliamentary election
 November 1888 Serbian parliamentary election

United Kingdom
 1888 Ayr Burghs by-election
 1888 Mid Lanarkshire by-election

See also
 :Category:1888 elections

1888
Elections